Arājs (feminine: Arāja) is a Latvian occupational surname, derived from the Latvian word for "ploughman". Individuals with the surname include:

 Ronalds Arājs (born 1987), Latvian athlete
 Oskars Arājs (born 1990), Latvian handball player
 Viktors Arājs (1910–1988), Latvian collaborator and Nazi SS officer

Latvian-language masculine surnames
Occupational surnames